Ronald F. Richard (born July 4, 1947) is an American politician from the state of Missouri. A Republican, Richard served in the Missouri House of Representatives, including as Speaker of the House before being elected to the State Senate in 2010. He is the first speaker to later be elected Missouri senator in more than 100 years, the first in Missouri's history to serve as top leader in both houses of his state's legislature, and the fifth person in United States history to do such. Richard represented the 32nd Senatorial District.

Personal life

Background and education

Richard was born in Parsons, Kansas.  After moving to Joplin during his childhood, Richard graduated from McAuley Catholic High School in 1965.  Richard attended Missouri Southern State University, receiving a bachelor of arts in 1969. He then furthered his education by attending graduate school at Southwest Missouri State College, receiving his master of arts in 1971.

Richard currently lives in Joplin with his wife, Patty.  They have two children together: Kara and Chad.

Career

Richard is a partner in A&R Development and C&R Development Corporation.  Additionally, Richard has full duties with C&N Bowl Corporation.

Group memberships and awards

Richard is a member of the Joplin Elks Lodge, the Joplin Chamber of Commerce, the National Federation of Independent Businesses, the Joplin Industrial and Development Authority, the Joplin Kiwanis Club, Missouri Farm Bureau, Scottish Rite Bodies, the Valley of Joplin, the Joplin Knights of Columbus, and the Missouri Higher Education Savings Program Board (MOST).  He is a former member of the Professional Bowlers Association and is the chairman of the Joplin 353 Downtown Development Corporation.

Richard was the recipient of the Missouri Southern State University Outstanding Alumni award in 2003, the RCGA Statesman Award in 2004, the St. Louis Business Journal Legislative Award, the Community College Award, and has served as the 7th District delegate to the Republican National Convention on multiple occasions.

Elected office

Richard's first role in politics came in 1990, when he was elected to the Joplin City Council.  He served on the city council until 1994, when he was elected mayor.  Richard served as Joplin mayor until 1997.

In 2002, Richard ran to replace the outgoing Chuck Surface, in the first session where term limits were enacted in 1992 and starting in 1994 fully affected all prior members.  Richard won a primary battle with fellow Republican Edward Duff, garnering over 75% of the vote.  He then won the general election in a three-way race with Democrat Fred Coombes and Libertarian Jack Stults, earning nearly 69% of the vote.  He has run unopposed in every election since.

In 2005, Richard was appointed chairman of the influential Committee on Job Creation and Economic Development.  Richard helped lead several key pieces of legislation through the Missouri House, including a bill that would have helped Canadian aerospace manufacturer Bombardier construct a mega-plant in the Kansas City metropolitan area.  Despite successful passage through the General Assembly and approval by Governor Matt Blunt, Bombardier decided not to relocate.

In September 2007, the House Republican caucus chose to meet and choose a successor to then-Speaker Rod Jetton for the 95th General Assembly.  This election was held "to fend off any fight during what could be a difficult election cycle," and to allow the prospective incoming speaker to attend leadership meetings in preparation for their new role.  In a caucus meeting, Richard beat out fellow Republican and Budget Committee chair Allen Icet to be preliminarily named Speaker of the 95th General Assembly. Upon convening the 95th General Assembly, Richard was named speaker by acclamation.

In 2010 he ran unopposed in both the primary and general election to assume the 32nd district state senate position formerly held by Gary Nodler.

Electoral history

External links

Official Missouri State Senate profile
Personal website

References

|-

|-

|-

1947 births
2020 United States presidential electors
21st-century American politicians
Living people
Mayors of places in Missouri
Missouri city council members
Missouri Southern State University alumni
Missouri State University alumni
People from Parsons, Kansas
Politicians from Joplin, Missouri
Speakers of the Missouri House of Representatives
Republican Party members of the Missouri House of Representatives
Republican Party Missouri state senators